Kamienka may refer to:

 Kamienka, Humenné District, Slovakia
 Kamienka, Stará Ľubovňa District, Slovakia

See also
 Kamenka (disambiguation)
 Kamianka (disambiguation)
 Kamionka (disambiguation)